The Culture Village (aka Jaddaf Waterfront) is a multi-purpose development project located in Al Jaddaf, Dubai, United Arab Emirates, along the shoreline of the Dubai Creek on a  plot of land. When completed the village will include a harbour, cultural and exhibition centres, and dockside development. The centrepiece of this project is Palazzo Versace Dubai, the world's second after Palazzo Versace of Queensland, Australia.

Projects of Dubai Cultural Village

Palazzo Versace

The hotel covers an area of 37,224 sqm, including restaurants, spa, 169 condominium residences and penthouses, 146 hotel rooms and 58 suites.

D1

D1 (meaning Dubai Number One) is an 80-floor residential skyscraper. The 80-story tower includes a sky rise lounge, indoor pool, and gymnasium. It is 284m tall, with a spire that is 350m tall.

Other projects include:

Iris Amber
Nur
Yuvi Residence

Districts
The development includes the following districts:

Residential district
Commercial district
Retail district
Shopping district

See also
Culture of Dubai
Global Village (Dubai)
Dheeraj and East Coast LLC

References

External links
Official website on Archive.org
Dubai-culturevillage.com
Gowealthy.com
Emporis.com

Year of establishment missing
Nakheel Properties
Buildings and structures in Dubai
Proposed buildings and structures in Dubai
Culture in Dubai
Communities in Dubai